Solobacterium moorei is a bacterium that has been identified as a contributor to halitosis. It is a gram-positive anaerobic bacillus, erroneously known as Bulleidia moorei, in the family Erysipelotrichaceae of the order Erysipelotrichales. This particular strain was identified by Kageyama and Benno in 2000, previously an unclassified Clostridium group RCA59.

References

External links
Type strain of Solobacterium moorei at BacDive -  the Bacterial Diversity Metadatabase

Gram-negative bacteria
Mollicutes
Bacteria described in 2000